Jariel Pierre Gabriel (born 10 April 2001) is a St. Maartener footballer who plays for Reggae Lions in the Sint Maarten Senior League and the Sint Maarten national team.

International 
On 10 September 2018, Gabriel made his senior team debut for the Sint Maarten national team, in a 0–13 loss to Haiti in a 2019–20 CONCACAF Nations League qualifying match. Gabriel came on in the 73rd minute to replace Jean Philip Sylveste.

References

External links 
 

2001 births
Living people
Sint Maarten footballers
Sint Maarten international footballers
Association football goalkeepers